Marie Jules Constant Robert Courrier ForMemRS (6 October 1895 – 13 March 1986) was a French biologist, and doctor. He was a secretary of the French Academy of Sciences from 1948 to 1986. He was the winner of 1963 CNRS Gold medal, the highest scientific research award in France.

Life
He graduated from University of Strasbourg School of Medicine with an MD in 1924, and University of Algiers with a PhD in Natural Sciences in 1927.

References

1895 births
1986 deaths
Members of the French Academy of Sciences
Foreign Members of the Royal Society